Liberty Township is an inactive township in Clay County, in the U.S. state of Missouri.

Liberty Township was erected in the 1820s, taking its name from Liberty, Missouri.

References

Townships in Missouri
Townships in Clay County, Missouri